Mian Dowhan, also rendered as Mian Dahan or Meyan Dehan, may refer to:
 Mian Dowhan-e Olya
 Mian Dowhan-e Sofla